Walkden Farm is a historic farmhouse in Swansea, Massachusetts.  The -story wood-frame house was built c. 1800, and is a well-preserved example of a vernacular Federal style farmhouse.  It has the typical five-bay center-entry layout with a large central chimney, with corner pilasters and a frieze below the roofline.  The entry is in a single-story hip-roofed projection, with full-length sidelights.  The property includes a c. 1885 barn.

The house was listed on the National Register of Historic Places in 1990.

See also
National Register of Historic Places listings in Bristol County, Massachusetts

References

Houses in Bristol County, Massachusetts
Swansea, Massachusetts
Houses on the National Register of Historic Places in Bristol County, Massachusetts